Papaipema appassionata, the pitcher plant borer, is a species of moth described by Leon F. Harvey in 1876. It is native to North America, where it has been recorded from Florida, Maine, Maryland, Massachusetts, Michigan, Minnesota, New Brunswick, Quebec, Rhode Island, South Carolina and Wisconsin. It is listed as threatened in the US state of Connecticut.

The wingspan is about 30 mm.

It uses the roots of Sarracenia species (including Sarracenia purpurea) as its host plant.

References

External links
Original description as Gortyna appassionata: 

appassionata
Moths of North America
Moths described in 1876

Taxa named by Leon F. Harvey